The Takush River is a small river on the Central Coast of British Columbia, Canada, flowing north into Ahclakerho Channel, which is part of Smith Sound.

See also
List of British Columbia rivers
Takush Harbour

References

Rivers of the Central Coast of British Columbia